Shaoguan railway station is a railway station located in Wujiang District, Shaoguan, Guangdong, China. The name originally referred to the station on the Jingguang Railway which has since been renamed to Shaoguan East railway station.

Video

Railway stations in Guangdong
Railway stations in China opened in 2009
Buildings and structures in Shaoguan
Articles containing video clips
Stations on the Wuhan–Guangzhou High-Speed Railway